D310 connects the A1 motorway Jastrebarsko interchange to the city of Jastrebarsko itself. The route comprises a significant number of urban intersections, in segment of the road running through Jastrebarsko.

The road, as well as all other state roads in Croatia, is managed and maintained by Hrvatske ceste, state owned company.

Traffic volume 

The D310 state road traffic volume is not reported by Hrvatske ceste, however they regularly count and report traffic volume on the A1 motorway Jastrebarsko interchange, which connects to the D310 road only, thus permitting the D310 road traffic volume to be accurately calculated. The report includes no information on ASDT volumes.

Road junctions and populated areas

Sources

See also
 A1 motorway

State roads in Croatia
Zagreb County